The 2022 Saratov Oblast Duma election took place on 9–11 September 2022, on common election day, coinciding with the gubernatorial election. All 40 seats in the Oblast Duma were up for reelection.

Electoral system
Under current election laws, the Oblast Duma is elected for a term of five years, with parallel voting. 10 seats are elected by party-list proportional representation with a 5% electoral threshold, with the other half elected in 30 single-member constituencies by first-past-the-post voting. Until 2022 the number of mandates allocated in proportional and majoritarian parts were standing at 23 and 22 seats, respectively (so the total number of seats in the Duma had been reduced from 45 to 40). Seats in the proportional part are allocated using the Imperiali quota, modified to ensure that every party list, which passes the threshold, receives at least one mandate.

Candidates

Party lists
To register regional lists of candidates, parties need to collect 0.5% of signatures of all registered voters in Saratov Oblast. Prior to the election oblast-wide part of party lists was abolished with only territorial groups retaining.

The following parties were relieved from the necessity to collect signatures:
United Russia
Communist Party of the Russian Federation
A Just Russia — Patriots — For Truth
Liberal Democratic Party of Russia
New People

New People and Rodina will take part in Saratov Oblast legislative election for the first time.

Single-mandate constituencies
30 single-mandate constituencies were formed in Saratov Oblast, an increase of 8 seats since last redistricting in 2017.

To register, candidates in single-mandate constituencies need to collect 3% of signatures of registered voters in the constituency.

Results

|- style="background-color:#E9E9E9;text-align:center;"
! rowspan=2 colspan=2| Party
! colspan=5| Party list
! colspan=2| Constituency
! colspan=2| Total
|-
! width="75"| Votes
! %
! ±pp
! Seats
! +/–
! Seats
! +/–
! Seats
! +/–
|-
| style="background-color:;"|
| style="text-align:left;"| United Russia
| 597,854
| 60.50
|  6.34%
| 7
|  11
| 22
|  4
| 29
|  7
|-
| style="background-color:;"|
| style="text-align:left;"| Communist Party
| 141,829
| 14.35
|  0.32%
| 1
|  2
| 4
|  2
| 5
|  0
|-
| style="background-color:;"|
| style="text-align:left;"| Liberal Democratic Party
| 91,255
| 9.24
|  1.18%
| 1
|  0
| 1
|  0
| 2
|  0
|-
| style="background-color:;"|
| style="text-align:left;"| A Just Russia — For Truth
| 67,057
| 6.79
|  1.04%
| 1
|  0
| 1
|  1
| 2
|  1
|-
| colspan="11" style="background-color:#E9E9E9;"|
|-
| style="background-color:;"|
| style="text-align:left;"| New People
| 35,000
| 3.54
| New
| 0
| New
| 1
| New
| 1
| New
|-
| style="background-color:;"|
| style="text-align:left;"| Communists of Russia
| 29,232
| 2.96
|  0.70%
| 0
| 
| 0
| 
| 0
| 
|-
| style="background-color:;"|
| style="text-align:left;"| Rodina
| 15,902
| 1.61
| New
| 0
| New
| 1
| New
| 1
| New
|-
| style="background-color:;"|
| style="text-align:left;"| Independents
| —
| —
| —
| —
| —
| 0
|  1
| 0
|  1
|-
| style="text-align:left;" colspan="2"| Invalid ballots
| 9,978
| 1.01
|  0.1%
| —
| —
| —
| —
| —
| —
|- style="font-weight:bold"
| style="text-align:left;" colspan="2"| Total
| 988,111
| 100.00
| —
| 10
|  13
| 30
|  8
| 40
|  5
|-
| colspan="11" style="background-color:#E9E9E9;"|
|-
| style="text-align:left;" colspan="2"| Turnout
| 988,111
| 53.69
|  1.07%
| —
| —
| —
| —
| —
| —
|-
| style="text-align:left;" colspan="2"| Registered voters
| 1,840,460
| 100.00
| —
| —
| —
| —
| —
| —
| —
|-
| colspan="11" style="background-color:#E9E9E9;"|
|- style="font-weight:bold"
| colspan="10" |Source:
|
|}

Former Governor of Saratov Oblast Valery Radayev (United Russia) was appointed to the Federation Council, replacing retiring incumbent Oleg Alekseyev (United Russia).

See also
2022 Russian regional elections

References

Saratov Oblast
Politics of Saratov Oblast
Regional legislative elections in Russia